The Hot Soldier (Der heiße Soldat) is a satiric short story written in 1903 by Austrian author, storyteller, and dramatist Gustav Meyrink, as well as the title of the collection in which it appears.

Editions

References

1903 short stories
Austrian literature
Satirical stories